George Robert Timberlake (November 3, 1932 – November 7, 2012) was an American football player.  He played professionally as a linebacker in the National Football League (NFL). He was drafted by the Green Bay Packers in the third round of the 1954 NFL Draft and played with the team during the 1955 NFL season.

References

1932 births
2012 deaths
Players of American football from Long Beach, California
American football linebackers
USC Trojans football players
Green Bay Packers players